Khandaan is a 1979 Indian Hindi-language drama film, produced by Sibte Hassan Rizvi under the New World Enterprises banner and directed by Anil Ganguly. It stars Jeetendra, Sulakshana Pandit, Bindiya Goswami  and music composed by Khayyam. This film is remade in Telugu as Jeevitha Ratnam (1981).

Plot
Gauri Shankar, a clerk in a private firm, lives with his wife Savitri and two sons Vikas & Ravi. Vikas is married to Nanda. The impish Ravi falls in love with Usha. Vikas acquires a job and needs money for security deposit. Gauri Shankar is unable to raise the money and when he tries to steal from his office cashbox, he is caught. Ravi takes up the blame to protect his father.                 

Gauri Shankar passes away after confiding the truth to Savitiri. Vikas and Nanada move out of the house. Ravi returns from jail and learns that Usha is married to someone else. When Vikas lies that their mother has disowned him, a devastated Ravi leaves for the city, where he rescues Sandhya, the daughter of millionaire. Seth Dharmdas, the millionaire offers Ravi a job and within a short time, Ravi gains Dharmdas's trust. When Sandhya declares her love for him, Ravi politely refuses.                 

In the mean time, Usha has run away from her wedding and is in search of Ravi. She spots Ravi with Sandhya and suspects they are involved. When the confusion is resolved, Ravi finds out his brother's wicked ways and his ill-treatment of their mother. How everything is resolved toa happy ending forms the climax.

Cast

Jeetendra as Ravi G. Srivastav
Sulakshana Pandit as Usha
Bindiya Goswami as Sandhya
Rakesh Roshan in a Special Appearance
Bindu as Nanda V. Srivastav
Sujit Kumar as Vikas G. Srivastav
Nirupa Roy as Savitri G. Srivastav
Paidi Jairaj as Gaurishankar Srivastav
A. K. Hangal as Masterji, Usha's father
Dina Phatak as Usha's mother
Raj Kishore as Sandhya's brother
Pinchoo Kapoor as Sandhya's father

Soundtrack 
Music composed by Khayyam with lyrics by Naqsh Lyallpuri. The song "Mana teri nazar nein" was recorded for this movie, but was filmed in a later film Ahista Ahista, with music by Khayyam

External links

Khandaan movie info
Khandaan music info

1979 films
1970s Hindi-language films
1979 romantic drama films
Hindi films remade in other languages
Films directed by Anil Ganguly
Indian romantic drama films